Highland Forest is a county park in Fabius, New York. It is part of the Onondaga County Parks system. Proclaimed the "Adirondacks of Central New York," Highland Forest is the oldest county park in Onondaga County. Some of the trails at Highland Forest are part of the Finger Lakes Trail which begins at the Pennsylvania-New York border in Allegany State Park and continues to the Long Path in the Catskill Preserve.

References

County parks in New York (state)
Parks in Onondaga County, New York